Gage Workman Montgomery (2 May 1898 – 5 June 1963) was a Canadian politician and lawyer. Montgomery served as a Progressive Conservative party member of the House of Commons of Canada. He was born in Bedell Settlement, New Brunswick and became a barrister and lawyer by career.

He was first elected at the Victoria—Carleton riding in a 26 May 1952 by-election then re-elected there in the 1953, 1957 and 1958 federal elections. Montgomery left the House of Commons after completing his term in the 24th Parliament and did not seek another term in office in the 1962 election.

External links
 

1898 births
1963 deaths
Members of the House of Commons of Canada from New Brunswick
Progressive Conservative Party of Canada MPs
Lawyers in New Brunswick